Born of the Flickering is the debut studio album by Norwegian black metal band Old Man's Child. It was released in 1996, through Hot Records, then later through Century Media with different artwork.

Track listing 

 "Demons of the Thorncastle" – 4:47
 "Swallowed by a Buried One" – 4:51
 "Born of the Flickering" – 5:05
 "King of the Dark Ages" – 5:27
 "Wounds from the Night of Magic" – 3:28
 "On Through the Desert Storm" – 4:20
 "Christian Death" – 4:55
 "Funeral, Swords and Souls" – 4:56
 "The Last Chapter" – 4:42
 "...Leads to Utopia/The Old Man's Dream" – 8:44

Personnel 

 Galder – vocals, guitar, synthesizer
 Jardar – guitar
 Tjodalv – drums
 Gonde – bass guitar
 Aldrahn - vocals

Additional personnel
 Christophe Szpajdel — logo

References 

Old Man's Child albums
1995 debut albums